Albert Sigurður Guðmundsson (5 October 1923 – 7 April 1994) was an Icelandic professional footballer who played for, amongst others, Rangers, Arsenal, FC Nancy and A.C. Milan. After retiring from his sporting career he became a politician and was a member of Alþingi for 15 years, serving as Minister of Finance of Iceland and Minister of Industry.

Sporting career
Albert played football from a young age with local club Valur. In 1944 he made his way to Scotland to study business at Skerry's College, Glasgow. He began his foreign footballing career with Rangers. After a short stint there he went to England where he played for Arsenal as an amateur; he played several friendly matches and two First Division matches in October 1946. He was only Arsenal's second foreign player.

Political career

In 1974, he was elected to the Alþingi (the Icelandic parliament), representing Reykjavík.  He ran for president in 1980 election but only finished third and lost to Vigdís Finnbogadóttir. In 1983, he became Minister of Finance of Iceland. In 1985, he was appointed Minister of Industry, a position he held until 1987, when a tax scandal forced his resignation.

Feeling that the Independence Party's leadership had failed to support him, he left the party soon after his resignation and only a few weeks before a general election.

References

External links
 Alþingi – Biography of ministers: Albert Guðmundsson (in Icelandic)

1923 births
1994 deaths
Albert Gudmundsson
Albert Gudmundsson
Albert Gudmundsson
Albert Gudmundsson
Rangers F.C. players
Arsenal F.C. players
A.C. Milan players
Racing Club de France Football players
OGC Nice players
FC Nancy players
Albert Gudmundsson
Albert Gudmundsson
Expatriate footballers in England
Expatriate footballers in France
Expatriate footballers in Italy
Expatriate footballers in Scotland
Icelandic expatriate sportspeople in England
Icelandic expatriate sportspeople in France
Icelandic expatriate sportspeople in Italy
Icelandic expatriate sportspeople in Scotland
Ligue 1 players
Serie A players
English Football League players
Albert Gudmundsson
Albert Gudmundsson
Albert Gudmundsson
Albert Gudmundsson
Albert Gudmundsson
Albert Gudmundsson
People educated at Skerry's College
Albert Gudmundsson
Albert Gudmundsson
Association football forwards